The 2002–03 Honduran Liga Nacional de Ascenso was the 36th season of the Second level in Honduran football and the first one under the name Liga Nacional de Ascenso.  Under the management of Carlos Martínez, Atlético Olanchano won the tournament after defeating Deportes Savio in the final series and obtained promotion to the 2003–04 Honduran Liga Nacional.

Final

 Atlético Olanchano won 2–1 on aggregated.

References

Ascenso
2002